Marinospirillum alkaliphilum is an alkaliphilic and Gram-negative bacterium from the genus of Marinospirillum which has been isolated from the Haoji soda lake in China.

References

Oceanospirillales
Bacteria described in 2002